Werbrouck is a surname. Notable people with the surname include: 

Joseph Werbrouck (1882–1974), Belgian track cyclist
Marcelle Werbrouck (1889–1959), Belgian Egyptologist
Ulla Werbrouck (born 1972), Belgian politician and judoka

Surnames of Belgian origin